Celle – Uelzen is an electoral constituency (German: Wahlkreis) represented in the Bundestag. It elects one member via first-past-the-post voting. Under the current constituency numbering system, it is designated as constituency 44. It is located in eastern Lower Saxony, comprising the districts of Celle and Uelzen.

Celle – Uelzen was created for the inaugural 1949 federal election. Since 2009, it has been represented by Henning Otte of the Christian Democratic Union (CDU).

Geography
Celle – Uelzen is located in eastern Lower Saxony. As of the 2021 federal election, it comprises the entirety of the districts of Celle and Uelzen.

History
Celle – Uelzen was created in 1949, then known as Celle. It acquired its current name in the 1980 election. In the inaugural Bundestag election, it was Lower Saxony constituency 16 in the numbering system. From 1953 through 1961, it was number 38. From 1965 through 1998, it was number 39. In the 2002 and 2005 elections, it was number 44. In the 2009 election, it was number 45. Since the 2013 election, it has been number 44.

Originally, the constituency comprised the independent city of Celle, the district of Celle, and the municipalities of Burgdorf and Uetze from the Burgdorf district. In the 1965 election, it lost the Uetze municipality while acquiring the rest of the Burgdorf district. For the 1976 election, it comprised the Celle district and the municipalities of Burgdorf, Burgwedel, Isernhagen, Lehrte, Sehnde, and Wedemark from the Landkreis Hannover district. It acquired its current borders in the 1980 election.

Members
Margot Kalinke of the German Party (DP) won in 1957 and served a single term. She was succeeded by Wilhelm Brese of the Christian Democratic Union (CDU), who served 1961 to 1969. Party fellow  served from 1969 to 1972, when the SPD won the constituency.  served from 1972 to 1976, when Hubrig again won. He served until 1983.  of the CDU served from then until 1998, when the SPD's Peter Struck won the constituency. In 2009, Henning Otte of the CDU was elected representative. He was re-elected in 2013, 2017, and 2021.

Election results

2021 election

2017 election

2013 election

2009 election

References

Federal electoral districts in Lower Saxony
1949 establishments in West Germany
Constituencies established in 1949